Henry VIII (VI) the Sparrow ( – 14 March 1397) was a Duke of Żagań–Głogów during 1368–1378 (as a co-ruler with his brothers), from 1378 ruler over Zielona Góra, Szprotawa, Kożuchów, Przemków and Sulechów, and since 1395 ruler over half of Głogów, Ścinawa and Bytom Odrzański.

He was the second son of Henry V of Iron, Duke of Żagań–Głogów, by his wife Anna, daughter of Duke Wenceslaus of Płock. The origin of his nickname "Sparrow" (Wróbel) is unknown.

Life
After his father's death in 1369 Henry VIII ruled the Duchy of Żagań-Głogów jointly with his older brothers Henry VI and Henry VII Rumpold. However, he could take full power over the government only after the division of the Duchy between him and his brothers in 1378. Henry VIII received the towns of Kożuchów, Zielona Góra, Szprotawa, Sława, Nowe Miasteczko and Przemków. In 1382 Duke Władysław of Opole gave his daughter Katharina to Henry VIII in marriage. The couple received the government of the Opole cities of Prudnik and Głogówek as dowry. However, later Henry VIII had to give up Głogówek to his father-in-law's widow Euphemia of Masovia as her dower and he only could retain Prudnik. In 1393 Henry VIII acquired the rights of succession over the Duchy of Żagań after the death of his older brother Henry VI, but he only could take possession over after the death of his sister-in-law (Henry VI's widow) Hedwig of Legnica, because in the late Duke's will she received his lands as her dower (at the end, Henry VIII never received Żagań for his early death; his sons inherited the Duchy after Hedwig's resignation in 1403). Two years later, in 1395, Henry VIII took possession over Głogów after the death of his brother Henry VII Rumpold without issue.

Henry VIII had a slightly different character than his brothers. He loved banquets, games and knight tournaments. This lifestyle required large amounts of money, and in consequence, the Duke had a continuous financial problems. His major financial obligations were with Konrad II the Gray, Duke of Oleśnica, who after his death received Ścinawa as a payment. Later, he tried to obtain the Church's goods. This ended with his excommunication imposed by the Bishop of Wrocław. Coincidentally the Duke died shortly after, as a result of severe wounds obtained during a knights tournament in Legnica. His funeral took place in an atmosphere of scandal: his body was not buried for eight days, until the Church received the financial compensation for the Duke's behavior. He was buried in the Augustinian church in Żagań.

Marriage and issue
In 1382 Henry VIII married with Katharina (b. ca. 26 March 1367 – d. 6 June 1420), daughter of Duke Władysław of Opole. They had five children:
Jan I (b. ca. 1385 – d. 12 April 1439)
Henry IX the Older (b. ca. 1389 – d. 11 November 1467)
Henry X Rumpold (b. ca. 1390 – d. 18 January 1423)
Wenceslaus (b. ca. 1391 – d. bef. 4 February 1431)
Anna (b. ca. 1397 – d. 1426/33), married before 28 May 1417 to Duke Casimir I of Oświęcim.

In his will, he left his widow the towns of Prudnik, Kożuchów and Zielona Góra as her dower, which she ruled until her death.

References
Sources

Gnealogical database by Herbert Stoyan
This article was translated from his original in Polish Wikipedia.
Citations

External links
Jan Tęgowski, Ślub Małgorzaty  Siemowitówny  z Henrykiem VIII księciem Brzegu (Przyczynek źródłowy)

|-

|-

|-

|-

1350s births
1397 deaths

Year of birth uncertain
Piast dynasty
Dukes of Prudnik